Bridgers is a surname. Notable people with the surname include:

Aaron Bridgers (1918–2003), French jazz pianist
John Bridgers (died 2006), American football coach
Luther B. Bridgers (1884–1948), American minister and songwriter
Robert Rufus Bridgers (1819–1888), American politician
Phoebe Bridgers (born 1994), American singer-songwriter
Sean Bridgers (born 1968), American actor, screenwriter, and producer